Enterprise Lake is a lake in Wisconsin, United States. Part of its shoreline, and only island, belongs to Camp Mach-Kin-O-Siew. Enterprise Lake is a 509 acre lake located in Langlade County.

References

External links
 

Lakes of Langlade County, Wisconsin